The first López Miras government was a regional government of Murcia led by President Fernando López Miras. It was formed in May 2017 after the resignation of López Miras's predecessor Pedro Antonio Sánchez and ended in August 2019 following the regional election.

Government

References

2017 establishments in Murcia (region)
2019 disestablishments in Murcia (region)
Cabinets established in 2017
Cabinets disestablished in 2019
Cabinets of Murcia (region)